William Rice (July 26, 1938 - April 3, 2016) was an American food journalist. He was editor-in-chief for New York’s Food and Wine magazine; The Washington Post’s first ever restaurant critic and a food and wine critic at The Chicago Tribune.  He also contributed articles to Travel and Leisure, GQ, Gourmet, Elle, and The Connoisseur. 

While at The Washington Post, he interviewed James Beard and Marcella Hazan among others.  He also covered the riots in Washington which followed the Martin Luther King 1968 assassination. Gibsons Bar & Steakhouse named the W. R. Chicago Cut for him. He chaired the James Beard Foundation’s restaurant awards committee. He was inducted into Who's Who of Food & Beverage in America" in its first year in 1984 and thereafter, Chicago’s Oyster Hall of Fame at Shaw's Crab House. He wrote two books: Feasts of Wine and Food and Steak Lover’s Cookbook. He co-edited three versions of Where to Eat in America.

References 

1938 births
2016 deaths
American magazine editors
American restaurant critics
The Washington Post journalists
Chicago Tribune people
American cookbook writers